is a 2011 Japanese film directed by Ataru Oikawa.

Cast
 Anna Ishibashi
 Rina Kirishima

References

2011 films
Films directed by Ataru Oikawa
2010s Japanese films